The 2018–19 CAF Confederation Cup (officially the 2018–19 Total CAF Confederation Cup for sponsorship reasons) was the 16th edition of Africa's secondary club football tournament organized by the Confederation of African Football (CAF), under the current CAF Confederation Cup title after the merger of CAF Cup and African Cup Winners' Cup.

This season follows a transitional calendar which allows the CAF club competitions to switch from a February-to-November schedule to an August–to-May schedule, as per the decision of the CAF Executive Committee on 20 July 2017. It started in December 2018, right after the 2018 season has finished, and concluded in May 2019, before the 2019 Africa Cup of Nations (which has been switched from January/February to June/July).

Zamalek won the title for the first time, defeating RS Berkane in the final 5–3 on penalties after being tied 1–1 on aggregate, and earned the right to play against the winners of the 2018–19 CAF Champions League in the 2020 CAF Super Cup.

Raja Casablanca were the defending champions, but were eliminated in the group stage.

Association team allocation
All 56 CAF member associations may enter the CAF Confederation Cup, with the 12 highest ranked associations according to their CAF 5-Year Ranking eligible to enter two teams in the competition. As a result, theoretically a maximum of 68 teams could enter the tournament (plus 16 teams eliminated from the CAF Champions League which enter the play-off round) – although this level has never been reached.

For the 2018–19 CAF Confederation Cup, the CAF uses the 2013–2017 CAF 5-Year Ranking, which calculates points for each entrant association based on their clubs’ performance over those 5 years in the CAF Champions League and CAF Confederation Cup. The criteria for points are the following:

The points are multiplied by a coefficient according to the year as follows:
2017 – 5
2016 – 4
2015 – 3
2014 – 2
2013 – 1

Teams
The following 55 teams from 43 associations entered the competition.
Nine teams (in bold) received a bye to the first round.
The other 46 teams entered the preliminary round.

Associations are shown according to their 2013–2017 CAF 5-Year Ranking – those with a ranking score have their rank and score indicated.

A further 15 teams (one fewer than usual) eliminated from the 2018–19 CAF Champions League enter the play-off round.

Notes

Associations which did not enter a team

 

 

 

Associations which did not enter a team initially, but had a team transferred from Champions League

Schedule
The schedule of the competition is as follows (matches scheduled in midweek in italics). Effective from the Confederation Cup group stage, weekend matches are played on Sundays while midweek matches are played on Wednesdays, with some exceptions. Kick-off times are also fixed at 13:00, 16:00 and 19:00 GMT.

Qualifying rounds

Preliminary round

First round

Play-off round

Group stage

In the group stage, each group was played on a home-and-away round-robin basis. The winners and runners-up of each group advanced to the quarter-finals of the knockout stage.

Group A

Group B

Group C

Group D

Knockout stage

Bracket

Quarter-finals

Semi-finals

Final

Top goalscorers

See also
2018–19 CAF Champions League
2020 CAF Super Cup

References

External links
Total Confederation Cup 2018/2019, CAFonline.com

2018–19
 
2
2